Shane Dronett (January 12, 1971 – January 21, 2009) was an American professional football player who was a defensive lineman in the National Football League (NFL) for the  Denver Broncos, Detroit Lions and Atlanta Falcons between 1992 and 2002. He played college football for the Texas Longhorns.

Early years
Shane Dronett was born in Orange, Texas, and graduated from Bridge City High School in Bridge City, Texas in 1989.  He attended the University of Texas at Austin on a football scholarship and in 1991 he was named an All-American with the Longhorns.

Professional career
In the 1992 NFL Draft, the Denver Broncos selected Dronett in the second round.  He remained with the Broncos for four seasons, playing all 16 games in his first year.  Dronett played for both the Atlanta Falcons and the Detroit Lions in 1996, playing 12 games total (5 for the Falcons, 7 for the Lions.) 

The Lions released Dronett at the end of the 1996 season, and he was rehired by the Falcons, who had just hired as their new head coach Dan Reeves, who had originally drafted Dronett to play for the Broncos.   Dronett played a significant role in the Falcons' defense, which ranked second in the NFL against the run, allowing only 75.2 rushing yards per game, and produced 313 tackles, 29.5 sacks, and 13 forced fumbles (11 recovered). When the Falcons won the NFC Championship in 1998, Dronett played in Super Bowl XXXIII against the Denver Broncos.

In January 2000, Dronett signed a five-year contract worth 20 million. In September, while playing with a partially torn ACL, Dronett suffered a complete torn ACL when sacking Carolina Panthers quarterback Steve Beuerlein. After sustaining the injury, Dronett returned one series later and finished the game with four tackles.

Dronett suffered several other injuries, including knee and shoulder problems, over the next two seasons that limited his ability to play.  He was released by the Falcons in 2003.

Death
After his playing career, Dronett began to exhibit paranoia, confusion, fear, and rage.  According to his family, Dronett's behavior changed radically.  He was diagnosed with a benign brain tumor in 2007.  Its removal did not alleviate Dronett's symptoms.

Dronett confronted his wife with a gun on January 21, 2009.  As she ran for safety, he turned the gun on himself. His death was ruled a suicide by the Gwinnett County Medical Examiner's office.

After his death, Dronett's brain was tested at Boston University School of Medicine's Center for the Study of Traumatic Encephalopathy.  Scientists determined that Dronett suffered from chronic traumatic encephalopathy, a brain disease associated with repeated head trauma.  According to the co-director of the center, Dr. Robert Stern, linemen are estimated to hit their heads about 1,000 times in each season they play.  While those hits may not result in concussions, the repetitive lesser brain injuries are likely associated with the disease.

He left a wife, Chris, and two daughters, Berkley and Hayley.

References

External links
Museum of the Gulf Coast Shane Dronett Biography
Obituary in the Atlanta Journal

1971 births
2009 deaths
People from Orange, Texas
American football players with chronic traumatic encephalopathy
Players of American football from Texas
American football defensive ends
American football defensive tackles
Texas Longhorns football players
Atlanta Falcons players
Denver Broncos players
Detroit Lions players
Suicides by firearm in Georgia (U.S. state)
2009 suicides